= Island grammar =

An island grammar is a grammar that describes only a small chunk of the underlying language. It is used in language parsing in situations where there is no requirement for checking the entire syntax of a provided text. Island grammars can be extended with the use of a bridge grammar.
